Qaleh Qazi Rural District is a rural district (dehestan) in the Qaleh Qazi District of Bandar Abbas County, Hormozgan Province, Iran. At the 2006 census, its population was 12,011, in 2,566 families.  The rural district has 21 villages.

References 

Rural Districts of Hormozgan Province
Bandar Abbas County